Matilda Nilsson (born 2 March 1997) is a Finnish ice hockey player and member of the Finnish national ice hockey team, currently playing in the Swedish Women's Hockey League (SDHL) with Brynäs IF Dam.

Playing career 
Nilsson grew up in Kirkkonummi, a municipality in the western Greater Helsinki region, where she began playing ice hockey at age 5. Her youth club was HC Salamat and she played on boys’ teams throughout her childhood until age 16. Regarding the experience, she has said, "I am so grateful that I got to play in boys. The differences [from women's hockey] can be seen in the physicality and doggedness. A different kind of hockey intelligence came from the games."

While playing with the Salamat boys’ teams, she also joined the women’s representative team of Keski-Uudenmaan Juniorikiekkoilun Tuki (KJT) in Kerava and made her senior debut at age 13, in the 2010–11 season of the Naisten Suomi-sarja, the third-tier women's league in Finland. She played 11 games in the qualification series, contributing 15 points (7 goals + 8 assists) as the team gained promotion to the second-tier Naisten I-divisioona (renamed Naisten Mestis in 2012).

Remaining with the club in the following season, she ranked third on the team for scoring across the regular season and qualifiers, with 23 points in 20 games. In the 2012–13 Mestis season, she nearly registered two points per game, with 44 points (26+19) in 23 games, ranking third of KJT players and fifth in the league overall. Nilsson’s performance, in addition to phenomenal seasons posted by many KJT players, most notably Noora Tulus (77 points), Tinja Haukijärvi (45 points), and Emmi Rakkolainen (41 points), helped the team gain promotion yet again, this time to the top-tier Naisten SM-sarja (renamed Naisten Liiga in 2017).

KJT struggled against the higher compete-level of the Naisten SM-sarja and finished the 2013–14 regular season at the bottom of the standings, with a goal differential of -134. Despite the challenges, several players had solid seasons, none more so than Nilsson who scored over a quarter of KJT’s goals and led the team in scoring, with 23 points in 27 games. KJT was able to save themselves from relegation in the qualifiers, thanks in part to the 19 points Nilsson contributed across the ten game series.

International play 
Nilsson played with the Finnish national U18 team at the 2014 IIHF World Women's U18 Championship, where Finland placed fifth.

At sixteen, Nilsson was invited to join the senior national team but was committed to other hobbies at the time and did not choose to pursue the opportunity.

She represented Finland at the 2018 4 Nations Cup and at several Euro Hockey Tour tournaments in the 2018–19 and 2019–20 seasons.

Nilsson was officially named to the Finnish roster for the 2020 IIHF Women's World Championship on 4 March 2020, before the tournament was cancelled on 7 March 2020 due to public health concerns related to COVID-19.

Personal life 
Nilsson and her family are Swedish-Finns, a culturally distinct group of people born in Finland speaking Swedish as their first language.

While playing with Salamat Kirkkonumi during the 2002–03 and 2003–04 Mestis seasons, Hockey Hall of Fame inductee Hayley Wickenheiser lived with the Nilsson family. Nilsson recalls "following her everywhere" as a five year old, watching what Wickenheiser did at the rink and in the locker room and adopting those habits, some of which have stuck with Nilsson into her senior career. The two women continue to communicate on a regular basis and Nilsson describes Wickenheiser as having played a significant role in her career.

Former NHLer Teemu Selänne, who was a partial owner of HC Salamat until 2006, is also a family friend of the Nilsson's and further inspired Nilsson to pursue hockey.

Outside of hockey, Nilsson works as a classroom assistant at a kindergarten in Kuopio. She has plans to study nursing in the future.

Nilsson is in a relationship with footballer Nea Aho, who most recently played with Kuopion Palloseura (KuPS) in the 2019 season of the Naisten Liiga (renamed Kansallinen Liiga in 2020). The couple planned to relocate to Sweden in the summer of 2020 so Nilsson could sign with a Swedish Women's Hockey League (SDHL) team but they altered course and chose to remain in Finland as the COVID-19 pandemic created uncertainty and other challenges.

Career statistics

Regular season and postseason 

* Postseason results for the 2013–14 season are from the qualification series rather than the playoffs and are not calculated with playoff totals.

Sources: Finnish Ice Hockey Association, Elite Prospects

International

Sources: IIHF, Hockey Canada

Awards and honors

References

External links 
 

1997 births
Living people
Brynäs IF Dam players
Finnish expatriate ice hockey players in Sweden
Finnish LGBT sportspeople
Finnish women's ice hockey forwards
HIFK Naiset players
KalPa Naiset players
LGBT ice hockey players
Naisten Liiga All-Stars
People from Kirkkonummi
Sportspeople from Uusimaa
Swedish-speaking Finns